The 2016 season was the 95th in the Cruzeiro Esporte Clube's existence. Along with the Campeonato Brasileiro Série A, the club also competed in the Campeonato Mineiro, the Primeira Liga and the Copa do Brasil.

Competitions

Overview

Campeonato Mineiro

First stage

Knockout phase

Semi-finals

Campeonato Brasileiro Série A

League table

Results by round

Matches

Primeira Liga

Group stage

Copa do Brasil 

The drawn for the first round was held on 11 January.

First round

Second round

Third round

Round of 16

Quarter-finals

Semi-finals

References

External links
 Cruzeiro Esporte Clube
 Cruzeiro official website (in Portuguese)

Brazilian football clubs 2016 season
2016 Cruzeiro Esporte Clube season